State humanities councils are private, non-profit partners of the National Endowment for the Humanities (NEH). There are 56 councils located in every U.S. state and jurisdiction. These councils work to support local public humanities programs as well as to extend the NEH's national programming to local communities. All state humanities councils receive federal funding through the National Endowment for the Humanities; beyond this, the councils are diversely funded through private donations, foundations, corporations, and/or state funding.

History
The NEH was initially skeptical of the creation of local programming entities on the model of the National Endowment for the Arts (NEA), which, by 1969, had created state-based arts agencies in every state. However, under pressure from Congress and especially Sen. Claiborne Pell, the NEH began to experiment with the creation of non-governmental state-based committees in 1971. The initial mission of these committees was to facilitate conversation about public policy. Responding to further pressure from Congress to transform the committees into state agencies, as the NEA had done, the NEH instead began working to increase the committees' autonomy. By 1980, the committees' programming agendas had been greatly broadened and the NEH had begun to refer to them as "state humanities councils." The Federation of State Humanities Councils was founded in 1977 as a membership organization for the state councils.

List of state humanities councils

References

External links
 National Endowment for the Humanities
 Federation of State Humanities Councils

Humanities
National Endowment for the Humanities